Golomb or Gollomb is a surname derived from a phonetical approximation of the Polish word "gołąb" (meaning "dove"). It may refer to:
Abraham Golomb (1888–1982) Yiddish-language teacher and writer
Eliyahu Golomb (1893–1945), leader of the Jewish defense effort in Mandate Palestine
Michael Golomb (1909–2008), American mathematician and educator
Rudy Gollomb (1911–1991), American football player
Solomon W. Golomb (1932–2016), American mathematician and engineer
 Golomb ruler
 Golomb coding

See also
 
Gołąb (surname)

Jewish surnames
Polish-language surnames